Wattanasap Jarernsri (born January 1, 1989), is a Thai professional footballer who plays as a midfielder.

Club career

References

External links
 Wattanasap Jarernsri at Goal.com

1989 births
Living people
Wattanasap Jarernsri
Wattanasap Jarernsri
Association football midfielders
Wattanasap Jarernsri
Wattanasap Jarernsri
Wattanasap Jarernsri
Wattanasap Jarernsri
Wattanasap Jarernsri